Ladislav Pešek (4 October 1906 – 13 July 1986) was a Czechoslovak film actor. He appeared in more than 90 films and television shows between 1931 and 1984.

Selected filmography
 Lidé na kře (1937)
 Škola základ života (1938)
 The Merry Wives (1938)
 Cesta do hlubin študákovy duše (1939)
 The Masked Lover (1940)
 Ladies in Waiting (1940)
 The Hard Life of an Adventurer (1941)
 A Charming Man (1941)
 The Blue Star Hotel (1941)
 Valentin the Good (1942)
 Judgement Day (1949)
 Komedianti (1954)
 Jan Hus (1954)
 Dog's Heads (1955)
 Jan Žižka (1955)
 Focus, Please! (1956)
 September Nights (1957)
 Dinner for Adele (1977) – Professor Albín Boček

References

External links
 Ladislav Pešek in Czech National Theater Archive
 Ladislav Pešek on Filmová databáze (Film database)
 
Ladislav Pešek on Česko-Slovenská filmová databáze (Czechoslovak film database)

1906 births
1986 deaths
Actors from Brno
People from the Margraviate of Moravia
Czech male film actors
20th-century Czech male actors
Burials at Vyšehrad Cemetery